Malkajgiri also known as Mallikarjuna Giri (Anicent Name) is a suburb of Hyderabad, Telangana, India. It is located in Medchal–Malkajgiri district and also Sub-District in Medchal District is the headquarters of Malkajgiri mandal in Malkajgiri revenue division. Erstwhile Malkajgiri Major Grampanchayat was upgraded to a municipality in 1965 and became a municipal corporation in 1985. It was merged into the Greater Hyderabad Municipal Corporation in 2007. It was a part of Ranga Reddy district before the re-organisation of districts in 2016.

Etymology
The ancient name of Malkajgiri  is Mallikarjunagiri 
dedicated to Mallikarjuna Swamy Temple on Hills. Which eventually turned as the present . Earlier Malkajgiri has its own fort. Now its became ruins, we see walls and watch towers in Old Malkajgiri Area - Shaw Wallace Factory (Present).

The lakes like Safilguda Nadimi cheruvu, Safilguda Banda cheruvu, Ramakrishnapuram Munkidigan cheruvu are famous which falls under Neredmet (Esterwile Village). And also lots of small ponds which are vanished now. It has well connections with Moula-Ali history.

Though Malkajgiri is just 3 km away from Secunderabad, it was neglected in its development, which resulted in it not being up to the mark when compared with other Municipalities.

Demographics 
As of the 2001 India census,
Malkajgiri had a population of 413,571. The population is 51% male and 49% female. Malkajgiri has an average literacy ratio of 87% with a total of 321,525 literates. In terms of literacy, Malkajgiri ranked at first in the Rangareddy district, higher than the national averages of 59.5%; male literacy is 72%, and female literacy is 65%. In Malkajgiri, 7% of the population is under 6 years of age.

History
Malkajgiri mandal before bifurcated used to be much larger, 
It consisted of two municipal units.
They are 
Malkajgiri & Alwal Municipalities.
Malkajgiri : Malkajgiri, Mirjalguda, Moulali, Neredmet, Yapral, Kowkoor.
Alwal : Maccha Bollaram, Venkatapuram.
After district bifurcation "or" formation Alwal Municipality became a New Mandal  "Alwal mandal."

Villages in Malkajgiri Mandal

Malkajgiri is a Mandal in Ranga Reddy (Eastrwile) district of Telangana state in India. Below is the list of Towns and Villages in Malkajgiri Mandal. Total Number of Villages in this Mandal list are 7.

Alwal (Municipality)
Ammuguda
Kowkur
Lothkunta
Macha Bolaram
Malkajgiri (Municipality)
Yapral
Later some villages merged in Alwal and formed Alwal Mandal by burificating Malkajgiri Mandal in 2017.

At Present now Malkajgiri Mandal has following neighbourhoods erstwhile Villages:

Malkajgiri has two revenue villages. They are Malkajgiri and Ammuguda Villages.
Malkajgiri Major Village Consists of,
 Malkajgiri Main Village (Including Talla Basthi, Hanumanpet,Mirzalguda earlier Hamlet villages)
 Neredmet Main Village (Including earlier Hamlet villages Safilguda, Ramakrishnapuram)
 Moula Ali (Some parts of it later merged into Cherlapally Village i.e. Cherlapally Jail to Moula Ali Sub Station Areas).

The Ammuguda revenue village consists of,
 Ammuguda Village

Localities with in Malkajgiri Village
Malkajgiri Village has six sub regions in it. They are Old Malkajgiri, Malkajgiri X Roads,
Old Mirzalguda, New Mirzalguda, Anutex, Hanumanpet.

Old Malakajgiri
 Bala Saraswathi Nagar
Kummari Wada Basthi
Narsimha Reddy Nagar
Maruthi Nagar
Old Malkajgiri Village
Durga Nagar
Sathi Reddy Nagar
Chinthal Basthi
Venkateshwara Nagar
Patel Nagar
Shawallace liquor company Area.(Ancient Fort Ruins Area)

Malkajgiri X Roads 
 Sanjay Nagar
 Sanjeev Nagar
 Brundavan Colony
Venkateshwara Nagar
Geetha Nagar (Municipal Office & District Hospital Area)
Shawallace liquor company Area

Old Mirzalguda 
Old Mirzalguda
Mirzalguda X Road
Yadav Nagar
Ekalavya Nagar
 Goutham Nagar
Mallikarjuna Nagar ( Ancient Mallanna Temple Area or Mallikarjunagiri) 
Veena Pani Nagar
Raja Nagar
Madhusudhan Nagar
Malkajgri Railway Station Area
Bank Colony
Sivapuri Colony
New Shivapuri Colony

New Mizalguda 
 BJR Nagar
Vasanthapuri Colony
Sripuri Colony
Ambedkar Nagar
PVN Colony
Raghavendra Nagar
Vasantha Vihar Colony
Jawahar Nagar

Anutex 
Vani Nagar
Bhavani Nagar
Sai Nagar ( Sai Baba Temple)

Hanumanpet
Joythi Nagar
Gopal Nagar
I. N. Nagar
J.L.N.S Nagar
Hill Top Colony
Sri Ramanjaneya Nagar
New Venkateshwara Nagar
Budha Vihar

Administration & Jurisdiction
Malkajgiri is administered by GHMC as Circle No. 28 which falls under Secunderabad Zone. It includes seven wards which include:

 136 Neredmet division
 137 Vinayak nagar division 
 138 Moula Ali division 
 139 East anandbagh division
 140 Malkajgiri division
 141 Goutham Nagar division

Malkajgiri Mandal has also Administered by Mandal Revenue Office. It consists of Malkajgiri (M) Village & also Ammuguda Village.

Jurisdiction falls under Malkajgiri Metropolitan Court & 2 Police Station's limits, Malkajgiri Police Station & Neredmet Police Station's.

Transport 
Malkajgiri is well-connected with other parts of the city by road as well as rail. The Malkajgiri Junction Railway Station is located at the backside of St. Martins High School will soon be converted into a major junction. Until now the station has 4 tracks and 3 Platforms in which 2nd&3rd Platforms are only Electrified. There is a Railway Reservation Complex too. thereby connecting it to most of the places by rail route.

Nearest metro station is Mettuguda on Blue line of Hyderabad Metro.

Railway Stations

Malkajgiri has six Suburban railway stations with two more under construction.
 Malkajgiri Junction Railway Station
 Moula Ali Railway Station
 Safilguda Railway Station
 Dayanandnagar Railway Station
 Ramakistapuram Gate Railway Station
 Ammuguda Railway Station

Under Construction - MMTS Phase
  Neredmet Railway Station 
  Moula Ali HB Colony Railway Station

Malkajgiri is less than 15 drive from Secunderabad Railway Station. It is also just 3 km away from Mettuguda junction, where the road leading to Uppal and the International Airport is being expanded into eight lanes.

Politics 
Malkajgiri (Lok Sabha constituency) is India's largest constituency. The Malkajgiri (Assembly constituency) is a new constituency formed after the delimitation of constituencies. The General elections held in 2009 were the first elections to be held in this constituency. Akula Rajender Mudiraj was elected as MLA in 2009. In the 2014 general assembly elections, C. Kanaka Reddy (TRS) won by 2768 votes against Ram Chander Rao.N (BJP).

Landmarks

 Safilguda lake
 Ramakrishnapuram Lake
  Neredmet Banda Cheruvu
 Sai baba temple
 Neredmet Moodu Gullu

References 

Neighbourhoods in Hyderabad, India